Drive Through Charisma is the 1993 debut album by the Australian rock band The Fauves, released on Polydor.

The original release of the album included a 22 track bonus disc, featuring early demos and some live songs. The bonus disc was accompanied by a separate booklet titled "22 Reasons Why A Band Shouldn't Put An Album Out In Its First Few Years." The booklet was written by the band and provided critical analysis for each track.

Details
Guitarist Phil Leonard later said of the album, "I think we took a few too many dark alleys on Drive Through Charisma."

Cox said, "We stumped up $15K for our first album and somehow managed to stooge Polydor into signing us who were then stuck with us for another three releases. Rarely has such a modest sum produced so much quantity. At 65 minutes with 23 track bonus disc it was like a meal at Sizzler - lots of it, but stay away from the salad bar. Reviewers were unanimous in their opinion that the album was long."

Reception
Craig Mathieson said, "after two years of middling grunge dysfunctionalism, the Fauves are ready to take things a step further. Drive Through Charisma mixes hyper-kinetic Sonic Youth riff-play with the deep-seated obsessions of the group's two vocalist/songwriters: Physical corruption, social divergence, sexual deviancy, deception..."

Track listing
 Crashing Bore
 Hitler Youth
 Marble Arse
 Puffinhead And Manta Ray
 Orgasmosarion
 She's A Hunter
 Debauch Me
 Diving Bell
 Thin Body Thin Body
 Bone Park
 Self Immolator
 Lightning Cabinet
 Let Me Be your Toilet
 Rising Blow
 Arbuckle At Glenrowan

Track listing
Bonus disc: 
 What About The Kiss?
 Inland Sea
 Blue September
 Crumbling
 Circumcision
 A Moments Ornament
 People Hater
 In A Time of Plague
 Vibrosonic
 Out of Season
 Italian Movies
 Net Weight, One Pound
 Reflecto Boy
 The Man Who Never Sleeps
 I Saw the Birth of Jesus
 On A Trip to Sydney
 The Rapids
 On the World's Last Day
 Cavalry Fought
 Asylum
 Fade Behind the Green
 Runaway

References

The Fauves albums
1993 albums